NGC 860 is an elliptical galaxy located in the constellation Triangulum.
It is about 410 million light-years from the Milky Way. It was discovered by the French astronomer Édouard Stephan in 1871.

See also 
 List of NGC objects (1–1000)

References

External links 
 

Elliptical galaxies
0860
Triangulum (constellation)
008606